The 2010–11 Liga Națională was the 53rd season of Romanian Handball League, the top-level men's professional handball league in Romania. The league comprises 14 teams. HCM Constanța were the defending champions, for the third time in a row.

Standings 

Liga Națională (men's handball)
2010 in Romanian sport
2011 in Romanian sport
2010–11 domestic handball leagues